Leszek Nowosielski (born 12 September 1968) is a Canadian former fencer. He competed in the team sabre event at the 1992 Summer Olympics. He was inducted into the Lisgar Collegiate Institute Athletic Wall of Fame in 2009.

References

External links
 

1968 births
Living people
Canadian male fencers
Olympic fencers of Canada
Fencers at the 1992 Summer Olympics
Fencers from Montreal
Lisgar Collegiate Institute alumni
Medalists at the 1995 Pan American Games
Fencers at the 1995 Pan American Games
Pan American Games bronze medalists for Canada
Pan American Games medalists in fencing